Romance  is a 2013 Telugu-language comedy film directed by Darling Swamy and produced by G. Srinivasa Rao and Sreenivasa Kumar Naidu, under Good Cinemas Group, which also produced Ee Rojullo. The film stars Prince, Dimple Chopade, Manasa in the lead roles and Saikumar P, Bhargavi and others in vital roles. Apart from direction, Darling Swamy handled the Story, Screenplay and Dialogues while S. B. Uddhav and J. Prabhakar Reddy handled the editing and cinematography respectively. The film released worldwide on 2 August 2013.

Plot summary

Cast 
 Prince as Krishna
 Dimple Chopade as Anu
 Manasa as Lalitha
 Saikumar P as Bluetooth Babu
 Bhargavi as Shruti

Reception
Romance is the 4th film by Maruthi Media House. An article about small budget blockbusters and media strategies.

A critic from 123telugu wrote that "The plot of this film is very stale and the narration is poor. The film has many cliched and outdated sequences".

References

External links 

 

2013 films
2010s Telugu-language films
Films scored by Sai Karthik